Tatsiana Metleuskaya (born 14 September 1984) is a Belarusian race walker.

Achievements

References

1984 births
Living people
Belarusian female racewalkers
Place of birth missing (living people)
21st-century Belarusian women